Mount Palsson is a large and conspicuous mountain rising to 1,190 m. The feature is located at the north end of Whirlwind Inlet between Flint Glacier and Demorest Glacier on the east coast of Graham Land. The mountain was photographed by the United States Antarctic Service (USAS), 1939–41. Named by United Kingdom Antarctic Place-Names Committee (UK-APC) for Sveinn Palsson (1762–1840), Icelandic naturalist who carried out pioneer work on glaciers and ice caps in Iceland.

Mountains of Graham Land
Foyn Coast